Varin-e Pain (also Romanized as Varīn-e Pā’īn; also known as Var-e Pā’īn, Var-e Soflá, and Varīn-e Soflá) is a village in Khurheh Rural District, in the Central District of Mahallat County, Markazi Province, Iran.

Demographics 
At the 2006 census, its population was 393, in 119 families.

Language 
Persian (Iranian) is the primary language, although variants of the language can be found dated back several hundred years.

References 

Populated places in Mahallat County